WKGC-FM (90.7 FM) is a radio station licensed to Panama City, Florida, United States. The station is currently owned by Gulf Coast State College.

WKGC-FM was the brainchild of two Gulf Coast students, Charles Wooten and Ron Johnson, who concocted the idea in 1968. Initially, they only had enough donated materials for a 100-milliwatt AM signal, which was only strong enough to beam rock music into the student center. On October 21, 1974, WKGC-FM went on the air with a power of ten watts. In the course of two years, the college's District Board of Trustees appropriated $20,000 for the station's expansion. The station only ended up using $13,000 to expand to 9,200 watts, thanks to tower space donated by local radio station WDLP.

In 1976, WKGC-FM was eligible for funding by the state's Department of Education. With this funding, the current crew was able to hire full-time professional staff, which allowed more variety in programming and the creation of new educational experiences for students. The state's funding was followed by further funding from the Corporation for Public Broadcasting. Later that same year, WKGC had gained affiliation with NPR, broadening the station's repertoire to include more music, as well as NPR original programs such as All Things Considered.

In 1978, the station was granted a power increase to 28,500 watts, with its reach reportedly spanning from Pensacola to Apalachicola, as well as over the Alabama state line. In 1979, a satellite dish was installed on-site, for ease of recording programs for delayed broadcast. That same year, the Florida Legislature, among other funding agencies, granted WKGC-FM $350,000 for new facilities, marking the first time the station would operate from a real studio.

In 1982, Janus Broadcasting, former owner of Panama City's WGNE-FM, donated to the college what had been WGNE-AM's frequency. Janus' generosity led to WKGC becoming the first AM/FM community college radio station in America.

WKGC carries programming from National Public Radio as well as independently produced music programs.

HD channels
WKGC broadcasts three HD Radio channels:
 HD-1 simulcasts the main WKGC-FM signal.
 HD-2 carries Jazz Music
 HD-3 carries GCSC's student-run AlterNation

References

External links
 WKGC official website
 

KGC-FM
NPR member stations
Blues radio stations
Jazz radio stations in the United States
News and talk radio stations in the United States
Radio stations established in 1974
1974 establishments in Florida
KGC-FM